Eight teams from five countries participated in the 17th edition of the Turkmenistan President's Cup, which took place in Ashgabat's Olympic Stadium and Abadan Stadium between February 20 and 28 2011. The group toppers clashed in the final and stood to win $20,000 while the runners-up got half that amount. The third-placed team received $5,000.

Participating teams

2011
President's Cup